DOPF is a designer drug from the substituted amphetamine family. It was first synthesised by Alexander Shulgin and David Nichols in 1989 but was never published at the time, and was finally disclosed in Daniel Trachsel's review of the field in 2013. It has a binding affinity (Ki) of 9 nM at the serotonin receptor 5-HT2A but is not known to have been tested in humans.

See also 
 DOBU
 DOEF
 DOPR
 DOTFM
 2C-TFE
 2C-T-21
 2C-T-28

References 

Designer drugs
Psychedelic phenethylamines
Serotonin receptor agonists
Methoxy compounds
Organofluorides